Frederick Sasscer Jr. ( - November 1929) was an attorney, a journalist and an educator from Upper Marlboro, Maryland. Sasscer's family has lived in Upper Marlboro since the 1760s. His parents were Dr. Frederick Sasscer and Rosalie Ghiselin.

Sasscer was educated at St. John's College in Annapolis. After his graduation, he was principal of the Marlboro Academy and went on to study law. He was admitted to the bar and in 1882 he began his career as a journalist, first as editor of the Prince George's Enquirer and Southern Maryland Advertiser and later as owner of The Enquirer-Gazette. In 1902, Sasscer returned to education as superintendent of the Prince George's County Public Schools, a post he held until 1914. Sasscer remained active as a journalist throughout this time, until his death in 1929.

Personal life
In June 1893, Sasscer married Lucy Claggett, daughter of Robert and Emily Claggett. They had three children, Lucy, Robert and Harold.

Legacy
The Sasscer Administration Building is the headquarters location of Prince George's County Public Schools and was named for him.

References

1856 births
1929 deaths
St. John's College (Annapolis/Santa Fe) alumni
People from Upper Marlboro, Maryland
American school administrators
Maryland lawyers
19th-century American lawyers